Bernard Weish or Bernard Weiss (or Bernhard, or Weis, depending on who cited him) was a fictional linguist invented by unknown(s) in order to back the theories that differentiate between Valencian and the Catalan language, but it might be also possible the reversed possibility: it was created by an opposer of the Language secessionism to ridicule it and the Blaverists did not realize it.

At the beginning of the 1980s, a Dr. Bernard Weiss, a philologist from the Romance languages Department of the University of Munich, sent some papers to blaverist meetings and articles to the Valencian media on which he supported the secessionist linguistic theories regarding Valencian and Catalan. That way, the Blaverists had the scientific source they lacked from any other university. Dr. Weiss was the discoverer of manuscripts dating from the 11th century in the Mozarabic language by Valencian troubadours such as Bertran Desdelueg (likewise as Bertrand Ofqours), Luís Llach (freely translated as Miqel Jaqson) and Salvatore Coniglia (something like Johny Rabbity).

However, for six years, Dr. Bernard Weiss did not appear publicly or in any picture, he was never interviewed, and he did not reply back to the telephone. A leader of the Levante-EMV Valencian newspaper phoned to the University of Munich and he was reported that nobody under that name worked there . That was no problem for the organizers of the First Congress of the Valencian Language held in May 1985, in Elche, who invited him as the main lecturer.

The Valencian newspaper Las Provincias, which supports Blaverism, gave two contradictory pieces of information: Bernard Weiss went and he did not go.

ÉXITO DEL PRIMER CONGRÉS DE LA LLENGUA VALENCIANA
Elche (De nuestra redacción)
Con la lectura de conclusiones se cerrará hoy el [...]
(...) las sesiones han alcanzado gran altura, destacando la intervención del professor de la Universidad de Münich Bernard Weiss, con un interesante trabajo sobre la lingüística valenciana.
(Las Provincias, 19-05-85, p.2)

 
SUCCESS OF THE FIRST CONGRESS OF THE VALENCIAN LANGUAGE
Elche (From our redaction)
Today (the Congress) shall end after the conclusions are read...
Sessions have been a success, highlighting the intervention of the University of Münich Dr. Bernard Weiss, with a very interesting paper about Valencian linguistics.
(Las Provincias, 85-05-19, p.2)

CONCLUSIONES DEL PRIMER CONGRÉS DE LA LLENGUA VALENCIANA
El idioma valenciano es autóctono
Elche (Vicente Pastor Chillar)
(...) El primer día o fecha inaugural resultó frío, por la escasez de asistentes, que se multiplicaron durante el sábado y, particularmente, el domingo, en que llegaron varios turismos y autocares desde Valencia.
La primera conclusión de la asamblea es que la lengua valenciana constituye un idioma románico autóctono, en el que se da un caso único y sin precedentes (...)
Entre los ponentes han figurado (...) el professor Herran Bernhard Weiss, de la Universidad de Munich, cuya lección fue leída por una hermana suya, al serle imposible el desplazamiento (...)
Entre los acuerdos adoptados figura celebrar el Segundo Congreso y solicitar a S.M. El Rey que conceda de Real a la Academia de Cultura Valenciana.
(Las Provincias, 23-05-1985, p.42)

 
CONCLUSIONS OF THE FIRST CONGRESS OF THE VALENCIAN LANGUAGE
The Valencian language is autochthonous
Elche (Vicente Pastor Chillar)
 The first day was cold, due to the shortage of those presents, who got to be numerous on Saturday and, specially, on Sunday, when many cars and buses arrived from Valencia.
The first conclusion of the meeting is that the Valencian language is an autochthonous Romanic language on which a unique situation and without precedents (...)
Between the lecturers we can count (...) Dr. Herran Bernhard Weiss, from the University of Munich, whose paper was read by his sister, since he couldn't trip (...)
Some of the resolutions are celebrating a Second Congress and asking H.M The King the title of "Royal'' to the "Academy of Valencian Culture".
(Las Provincias, 1985-05-23, p.42)

After this public (dis)apparition Bernard Weiss was never more referred to, and none of his papers was published again. Blaverists could no longer fake his existence, or their opponent laughed at them.

The supposed manuscripts have never been published or showed publicly. Also, the Academy of Valencian Culture is now Royal.

References 
 Levante, Letters to the director, 1985-04-21
Vicent Bello, La Pesta Blava, Ed. 3i4, València 1988, p. 242-247

External links 
 The Blavers' wrong information

Nonexistent people used in hoaxes
Valencian Community
Catalan language
Fictional linguists
Fictional German people